Funland Amusement Park, commonly known as Funland, is a small amusement park located in Idaho Falls, Idaho, United States. Funland is situated within the  campus of Tautphaus Park, and it opened to the public in 1947.

History

Early history 
Tautphaus Park was established by Charles Tautphaus in the late 19th century when he made a six-acre lake and fed it with water from the Idaho Canal, which he helped create. It became a city park in 1910 and it was the center of many community events like rodeos and county fairs. In 1934, several log buildings were constructed throughout the park by the Works Progress Administration. Two buildings were built at the southwest corner of the lake and were used as changing rooms and restrooms for bathers. A group of businessmen obtained a lease from the city to open their chicken restaurant in the former dressing room building and operate amusement rides in 1947. The carousel was the first ride and others were added over the years.

1950s–2019 
Equipment mechanic Leo Larsen eventually became the owner of Funland and continued to operate it under a lease with the city until 2000. At that point, Larsen sold Funland to Ann Rehnberg who continued to operate everything as it was until she sold it to the City of Idaho Falls in 2019.

City ownership: 2019-Present 
In 2020, a committee was formed to oversee the revitalization of Funland. A grand re-opening is planned for the 75th anniversary of Funland in Spring of 2023. The historic rides and buildings will be retained with several upgrades to the grounds.

Rides

Other Attractions

Former Rides

References

External links 
 

1947 establishments in Idaho
Defunct amusement parks in the United States
Amusement parks in Idaho
Tourist attractions in Bonneville County, Idaho
Idaho Falls, Idaho